Vicken Cheterian (Western , Eastern ) is a Lebanese-born journalist and author, who teaches international relations at Webster University Geneva. He has also lectured at University of Geneva and SOAS University of London (2012-14). Cheterian is also a columnist for the Istanbul-based weekly Agos. He holds a PhD from Graduate Institute of International and Development Studies (IUHEI).

Works

 “Roots of ISIS Violence and the Killing Fields of the Middle East,” Survival , Vol. 57, Issue 2, 2015, pp. 105-118.
 "Origins and Trajectory of the Conflicts in the Caucasus", Europe-Asia Studies , Vol. 64, No. 9, 2012, pp. 1625-1649.
 "Karabakh Conflict After Kosovo: No Way Out?", Nationalities Papers , Vol. 40, No. 5, 2012, pp. 703-720.
 "Kyrgyzstan, Central asia's Island of Instability", Survival , Vol. 52, No. 5, 2010, pp. 21-27.
 "History, memory and international relations: the Armenian diaspora and Armenian-Turkish relations", International Relations , No. 141, 2010, pp. 7-24.
 "The August 2008 War in Georgia: from ethnic conflict to border wars", Central Asian Survey , Vol. 28, No. 2, 2009, pp. 155-170.
 "From Reform and Transition to 'Colored Revolutions'" Journal of Communist Studies and Transition Politics , Vol. 25, No. 2, 2009, pp. 136-160.
 "Georgia's Rose Revolution: Change or Repetition? Tension between State-Building and Modernization Projects", Nationalities Papers , Vol. 36, No. 4, 2008, pp. 689-712.

References

Webster University faculty
Historians of the Caucasus
Historians of the Armenian genocide
Swiss people of Armenian descent
Swiss journalists
Ethnic Armenian journalists
International relations scholars
People from Beirut
Lebanese people of Armenian descent
Year of birth missing (living people)
Living people
Graduate Institute of International and Development Studies alumni